Sir John Robert Madejski,  (born Robert John Hurst; 28 April 1941) is an English businessman, with commercial interests spanning property, broadcast media, hotels, restaurants, publishing and football. He changed his name when his stepfather, a Polish airman during World War II, returned to England to marry his mother.

Madejski is the founder of the magazine which became Auto Trader and was chairman of Reading F.C., Chancellor of the University of Reading and a Deputy Lieutenant of Berkshire. He is a benefactor to many institutions, especially in academia, education and the arts. In the Sunday Times Rich List 2009 ranking of the wealthiest people in the UK he was placed 222nd with an estimated fortune of £250 million.

Life and business career
Madejski was born Robert John Hurst on 28 April 1941, in Stoke-on-Trent, as a result of a wartime fling, being initially placed with a foster family. While still a baby, Hurst was moved back to his mother's home town of Reading and placed in a children's home. His mother later married a Polish Second World War airman, Zygmunt Madejski, with Hurst eventually coming to live with them and adopting his stepfather's surname of Madejski. Hurst's biological father had started another family.

While on holiday in Florida in the mid-1970s, Madejski saw a car sales magazine that included pictures of the vehicles on sale. He immediately realised the potential of the idea and with the help of his business partners Paul Gibbons and Peter Taylor founded Thames Valley Trader in 1976. Initially the magazine advertised anything and everything, from houses to cars and even aircraft, but it soon concentrated solely on vehicles, and was renamed Auto Trader. Madejski partnered with the Guardian Media Group in 1982 to give the title national exposure.

By 1998, 52 titles were being published with a combined circulation of more than 700,000. In 1998, he sold his company Hurst Publishing for £174 million.

He owns a large number of luxury cars, including two Rolls-Royces, two Bentleys, four Jaguars, an AC Cobra and two Ferraris, including a red 328 which sits inside a glass case in the gym of his home. 
Madejski has two daughters, but has never married. He made front-page headlines in UK tabloid newspapers in October 2004 due to his alleged romantic attachment with singer and TV star Cilla Black. The pair became friends due to their mutual affiliation with the Conservative Party. On 3 March 2007, Madejski was shown on the BBC programme Match of the Day seated between Black and Chris Tarrant watching the Reading F.C. game against Arsenal F.C. at the Emirates Stadium.

Reading F.C.
Madejski became chairman of the Football League club Reading F.C. in 1990, and has given his name to the club's Madejski Stadium, built in 1998 with £25 million largely contributed by him. He rescued Reading from receivership. He said "When Robert Maxwell was alive I offered him five pounds a share. When he fell off his boat I got them for 10p. Funny old life isn't it?". In 2006, he led the club to the top tier of English football for the first time in its 135-year history and proposed to expand the stadium to 38,000 seats. After Premier League promotion, Madejski said he was ready to sell up:The brand is getting stronger all the time and if there is a billionaire who wants a nice accessory down the M4 then come and talk to me. Apart from Manchester United, unless you've got a sugar daddy with really deep pockets, you're wasting your time. The club achieved pre-tax profits of £6.6m during the tax year ending in June 2007.

On 21 January 2012 it was announced that Madejski planned to relinquish control of the club by selling a 51% stake for £40m to Thames Sports Investments, a Russian consortium headed by Anton Zingarevich. Madejski announced that as part of the deal he would continue as chairman for at least another two years, followed by becoming honorary life president. Madejski's reign as owner of the club officially ended on 29 May 2012 when the takeover deal was completed.

Charitable activities

In 1990, Madejski donated £500,000 to the trustees of the Falkland Islands Memorial Chapel Trust.  The donation was crucial to the fund-raising effort and enabled the trustees to build the War Memorial Chapel, dedicated to the 255 fallen of the Falkland Islands War: it is situated in the grounds of Pangbourne College and was opened by the Queen in 2000.

He is also a benefactor to the Royal Academy of Arts in Piccadilly, London and in 2004 had the John Madejski Fine Rooms at Burlington House named after him in recognition of a contribution of £3 million to the institution. A sculpture by Edgar Degas, La Petite Danseuse de Quatorze Ans, that he purchased at Sotheby's in 2004 was on display in the John Madejski Fine Rooms; it was sold in February 2009 for £13.3 million.

The John Madejski Centre for Reputation at Henley Management College, the new garden at the Victoria and Albert Museum, a lecture theatre at the University of Reading and a gallery at the Museum of Reading also bear his name. The John Madejski Academy (formerly Thamesbridge College) has been found to be "inadequate" twice by the regulator Ofcom, and "requires improvement" three times.

Madejski has said he is not particularly concerned about how this might appear, adding "People can think what they like about me. I don't care. It's never been a popularity contest. I do it all for the community. In my view, you start life with nothing and you end it with nothing. I'd like to enjoy it all before I kick the bucket."  His most recent project was a £500m redevelopment of Reading town centre, but this has been halted by the credit crunch.

Political activities
In the early 2000s, Madejski was active in politics: he contributed extensively to the Conservative Party. Madejski and Dave Whelan called for football clubs to observe a minute's silence to mark the death of Margaret Thatcher.

Honours
In 2000 Madejski was appointed Officer of the Order of the British Empire (OBE) in the 2000 Birthday Honours "for services to Reading Football Club and the community in Reading, Berkshire." He is also Deputy Lord Lieutenant of Berkshire.
In 2006, he was admitted as a Freeman of the Borough "in recognition of the distinguished service rendered to the Borough of Reading, by his contribution to the growth and success of football in Reading, and by his support for education and arts".
On 14 December 2007, Madejski was awarded the Honorary Degree of Doctor of Letters University of Reading and formally installed as the seventh chancellor of the university, succeeding to the post on the retirement of Lord Carrington.
Madejski was knighted in the 2009 New Year Honours for charitable services.

References

External links
The John Madejski Academy
Pictures of the restored galleries at the Royal Academy and John Madejski Fine Rooms
The John Madejski Garden
The John Madejski Art Gallery
BBC Sport interview after Reading were promoted to the Premiership
BBC Radio Berkshire interview after Reading were promoted to the Premiership
Football boss made uni chancellor

1941 births
Living people
English businesspeople
Deputy Lieutenants of Berkshire
English football chairmen and investors
Chairmen of Reading F.C.
British magazine publishers (people)
People from Reading, Berkshire
People from Stoke-on-Trent
Businesspeople awarded knighthoods
Chancellors of the University of Reading
Officers of the Order of the British Empire
Knights Bachelor
English people of Polish descent
Conservative Party (UK) donors
Association football people awarded knighthoods